The name Nina has been used for thirteen typhoons in the northwest Pacific Ocean, one tropical cyclone in the northeast Pacific Ocean, and one tropical cyclone in the southwest Pacific.

Twelve typhoons have been named Nina. In addition, one hurricane in the Central Pacific was given this name because the policy at the time was to use typhoon names in the Central Pacific.
 Typhoon Nina (1953) (T5307) – made landfall in China.
 Hurricane Nina (1957) – a Category 1 hurricane in the Central Pacific.
 Typhoon Nina (1960) (T6025, 51W) – a strong typhoon that never made landfall.
 Tropical Depression Nina (1963) – a tropical cyclone which was considered by JMA as a tropical depression.
 Typhoon Nina (1966) (T6607, 07W) – a Category 1-equivalent typhoon
 Typhoon Nina (1968) (T6826, 31W, Seniang) – a typhoon that later crossed the Philippines as a weaker system.
 Tropical Storm Nina (1972) (T7204, 05W) – a minor storm which stayed at sea.
 Typhoon Nina (1975) (T7503, 04W, Bebeng) – struck Taiwan and China, eventually contributing to the collapse of the Banqiao Dam in central China, killing around 26,000–100,000 people.
 Tropical Storm Nina (1978) (T7823, 24W, Yaning) – a tropical storm which crossed the Philippines, killing 59.
 Tropical Storm Nina (1981) (T8109, 09W, Ibiang) – a weak and short-lived tropical storm that made landfall in eastern China.
 Tropical Storm Nina (1984) (T8415, 18W) – a relatively strong tropical storm that formed from a monsoon trough, but did not affect any land areas.
 Typhoon Nina (1987) (T8722, 22W, Sisang) – crossed the Philippines as a major typhoon, claiming 979 lives.
 Tropical Storm Nina (1992) (T9213, 14W) – another minor storm that stayed in the open ocean.
 Tropical Storm Nina (1995) (T9511, 15W, Helming) – a moderate storm that hit the Philippines and China.

PAGASA Naming The following typhoons were named Nina by PAGASA. After 2016, the PAGASA retired the name Nina in their naming lists and was replaced with Nika. 

In 2003, Typhoon Krovanh was named Niña, but as the name also appeared in the succeeding year’s list (albeit spelled Nina and not Niña), it was instead replaced by Nonoy, which went unused in 2007 and had its sole usage in 2011, before being replaced by Nona for 2015 due to similarities with the nickname of the Philippine president at that time, Benigno “Noynoy” Aquino. 

Typhoon Krovanh (2003) (T0312, 12W, Niña) – struck the Philippines and China, causing moderate damage.
Typhoon Songda (2004) (T0418, 22W, Nina) – struck Japan and became one of its costliest typhoons.
Typhoon Hagupit (2008) (T0814, 18W, Nina) – struck China, killing 67 and causing $1 billion in damage.
Typhoon Prapiroon (2012) (T1221, 22W, Nina) – a strong and erratic typhoon which eventually curved to sea, not affecting any landmass.
Typhoon Nock-ten (2016) (T1626, 30W, Nina) – a late-season powerful storm that affected the Philippines.

Southwest Pacific:
Cyclone Nina (1992–93), category 3 storm, crossed Oceania.

Pacific typhoon set index articles
Pacific hurricane set index articles
Australian region cyclone set index articles
South Pacific cyclone set index articles